Coptic Cairo is a part of Old Cairo which encompasses the Babylon Fortress, the Coptic Museum, the Hanging Church, the Greek Church of St. George and many other Coptic churches and historical sites. It is believed in Christian tradition that the Holy Family visited this area and stayed at the site of Saints Sergius and Bacchus Church (Abu Serga).  Coptic Cairo was a stronghold for Christianity in Egypt both before and during the Islamic era, as most of its churches were built after the Muslim conquest of Egypt in the 7th century.

History 
There is evidence of settlement in the area as early as the 6th century BC, when Persians built a fort on the Nile, north of Memphis. The Persians also built a canal from the Nile (at Fustat) to the Red Sea.  The Persian settlement was called Babylon, reminiscent of the ancient city along the Euphrates, and it gained importance while the nearby city of Memphis declined, as did Heliopolis.  During the Ptolemaic period, Babylon and its people were mostly forgotten.

It is traditionally held that the Holy Family  visited the area during the Flight into Egypt, seeking refuge from Herod.  Further it is held that Christianity began to spread in Egypt when St. Mark arrived in Alexandria, becoming the first Patriarch, though the religion remained underground during the rule of the Romans.  As the local population began to organize towards a revolt, the Romans, recognising the strategic importance of the region, took over the fort and relocated it nearby as the Babylon Fortress. Trajan reopened the canal to the Red Sea, bringing increased trade, though Egypt remained a backwater as far as the Romans were concerned.

Under the Romans, St. Mark and his successors were able to convert a substantial portion of the population, from pagan beliefs to Christianity.  As the Christian communities in Egypt grew, they were subjected to persecution by the Romans, under Emperor Diocletian around 300 AD, and the persecution continued following the Edict of Milan that declared religious toleration.  The Coptic Church later separated from the church of the Romans and the Byzantines. During the reign of Arcadius (395-408), a number of churches were built in Old Cairo.  In the early years of Arab rule, the Copts were allowed to build several churches within the old fortress area of Old Cairo.

The Ben Ezra Synagogue was established in Coptic Cairo in 1115, in what was previously a Coptic church that was built in the 8th century.  The Copts needed to sell it, in order to raise funds to pay taxes to Ibn Tulun.

In the 11th century AD, Coptic Cairo hosted the Seat of the Coptic Orthodox Pope of Alexandria, which is historically based in Alexandria. As the ruling powers moved from Alexandria to Cairo after the Arab invasion of Egypt during Pope Christodolos's tenure, Cairo became the fixed and official residence of the Coptic Pope at the Hanging Church in Coptic Cairo in 1047.

The Coptic Museum was established in 1910, and it houses the world's most important examples of Coptic art.

Churches 
Coptic Cairo is, to this day, a predominantly Christian area, hosting many historically important churches:

 Saint Mary Church (Haret Elroum)
 Saint Mercurius Church
 Saints Sergius and Bacchus Church (Abu Serga)
 The Hanging Church
 Church of the Holy Virgin (Babylon El-Darag)
 Saint Barbara Church
 The Church of Saint Menas
 Nunnery and Church of St. George (Cairo)
 Monastery and Church of St. George (Greek Orthodox)

See also 
 Copts in Egypt
 Coptic Orthodox Church
 Coptic architecture
 Seat of the Coptic Orthodox Pope of Alexandria
 Saint Mark's Coptic Orthodox Cathedral, Cairo
 Saint Mark's Coptic Orthodox Cathedral (Alexandria)
 Church of the Virgin Mary (Haret Zuweila)
 Holy family in Egypt
 Ben Ezra Synagogue

Notes

References

External links 

 Coptic Cairo Online
 Coptic Cairo on egyptology online
 Rising from the ashes, Al-Ahram

 
Cairo
Old Cairo
Coptic history